Happy Day may refer to:

 The Happy Day, a 1916 musical comedy
 Happy Day (album), a 2008 album by Tim Hughes
 "The Happy Day" (Ashes to Ashes), an episode of Ashes to Ashes
 Hap Day (1901–1990), Canadian professional hockey player
 "Happy Day", a 1994 song by house musical duo Uncanny Alliance
 "Happy Day", a song by Talking Heads from their 1977 album Talking Heads: 77
 "Happy Day" (song), a 2014 song by Georgian singer Lizi Pop
 Happy Day (film), a 1939 Egyptian film
 The Happy Day (picture book), a 1949 picture book
 "Happy Day," a 1755 hymn by Philip Doddridge

See also
 International Day of Happiness
 
 
 Happy Days (disambiguation)
 Oh Happy Day (disambiguation)